Princess Natalia Alexandrovna Romanovskaya-Iskander (– 25 July 1999), or simply Princess Iskander, was the last of two members of the male line of the House of Romanov to remain alive in the Soviet Union following the Revolution and its aftermath. The princess was a professional vertical motorcyclist and secret agent of the Lubyanka.

Early life
As the daughter of Prince Romanovsky-Iskander, né , and his first wife, Olga Iosifovna Rogowska (b 1893; disappeared in the USSR; d c. 1962, daughter of Iosif Rogowski) Romanovskaya-Iskander was the granddaughter of Grand Duke Nicholas Constantinovich, the disgraced grandson of Tsar Nicholas I; thus, she was a patrilineal great-great-granddaughter of Nicholas I. Her date of birth is disputed, and has been reported as 10 February 1916, 3 February 1917, or 17 February 1910.

Grand Duke Constantine Nicholaevich's son, Grand Duke Nicholas Constantinovich, was exiled to Central Asia in disgrace for stealing his mother's diamonds. Grand Duke Nicholas established a palace in Tashkent and lived in grand style where he sired a son, whom Tsar Alexander III (his great-uncle) granted the title Prince Iskander (Iskander was the Arabic form of Alexander).

This prince, Alexander Nikolaievich (15 November 1887 N.S. – 26 January 1957) who granted the name of Iskander and the rank of a Noble of the Russian Empire by Imperial Ukase 1889 and that of Hereditary Noble by Imperial Ukase 1899, also granted the title of Prince Romanovsky-Iskander with the qualification of Serene Highness by the Grand Duke Cyril Vladimirovich of Russia, who became the grandfather of Princess Natalia in absentia, in 1925, in turn, fathered the Princess Iskander. Alexander Nikolaievich only had issue by his first wife.

Natalia Androsova was born in Tashkent, a member of the Constantinovichi branch of the Russian Imperial Family. She had an older brother, Prince Kirill Romanovsky-Iskander (1914–1992). Her parents, who had been married since 5 May 1912, separated and in 1924 Natalia and her brother moved with their mother to Moscow (first moved to Plyushchikha Street, later to Old Arbat), where Olga remarried to Nicholas Androsov. Natalia's stepfather adopted her and her brother so Princess Iskander was renamed Natalia Nikolaievna Androsova. Her father remarried also, to Natalia Hanykova (b Saint Petersburg; 30/20 December 1893; d Nice 20 April 1982), dau of Maj.-Gen. Constantin Nikolaievich Hanykov and his wife Natalia Efimovna Markova, on 11 October 1930 in Paris.

After the Russian Revolution, Natalia and her brother Kirill were the only two Romanov descendants in the male line in the USSR; the rest either fled or were killed. They lived their entire lives in the USSR. She was married to Nicholas Vladimirovich Dostal (1909 - 22 April 1959) and had a daughter Eleonora Nikolaievna Dostal-Oruç (27 January 1937 - 2009). Her daughter was a socialite, philanthropist, noblewoman and an example of the modern phenomenon of the celebutante who rose to fame not because of her talent but because of her inherited wealth and controversial lifestyle in Turkey. The biographical novel The White Night of St. Petersburg (2004) was written by her second cousin Prince Michael of Greece and Denmark about her grandfather, Grand Duke Nicholas Constantinovich of Russia, and was based on Natalia's memories of him. She was a friend of Alexander Galich, Yuri Nikulin, Yuri Nagibin, and Alexander Vertinsky. Princess Natalia is also known for her brave personality. She was a motor-cyclist in motor-cyclist-circus. Besides, in the war time she was a driver in army.

Russian Revolution and Civil war
When the revolution progressed, the Iskander family decided that it was safer in Central Asia and joined the old grand duke in Tashkent; the place where Natalia's early childhood had been spent. Natalia was barely one year old when her grandfather was killed by local revolutionaries, the first grand duke to die in the Red Terror. The family never discussed the circumstances of his death, and now no one knows exactly what happened. Her father and uncle Artemi left home to join the Whites, and for a time the two Iskander princes were lost in the swirling havoc of civil war. Prince Alexander was reported missing in action. Meanwhile, the revolutionaries forced Natalia, her brother Kirill and her mother Olga to leave the grand ducal palace, but they did not persecute them.

Adult life
The family were helped by the fact that their name was Iskander, not Romanov, but even more by the preoccupation of the revolutionaries with their own survival in a bitter seesaw civil war. After the war, the palace became a museum and little Natalia would visit it, aware of the fact that it had once been her home and that all its treasures-armor, sculpture, paintings-had once belonged to her family. The lavish rose garden, shielded by its high walls from Asian dust and harsh desert winds, continued to bloom. And in the cellar, a few hunting dogs still lived. Their master was gone, but they waited for his return. Peace meant that the Bolsheviks would have the opportunity to become interested in the Iskander family, conspicuous because of the memory of the grand duke. Nicholas Constantinovich had spent his own personal funds to build canals for irrigating the crops essential for sustaining the life of the people. But Natalia's mother knew she could expect no gratitude from the Bolsheviks and decided that she would take her family to Moscow.

Giving up her husband for lost, she married and changed the name of her children immediately to that of her new husband. Thus Natalia dropped Iskander for Androsova. Moscow offered new jobs and also safety in anonymity of big city life. Former tsarist officers, bureaucrats, professors and merchants hoped to find privacy and security in the bustling new capital of the Soviet regime. The new-Androsovs found a spacious apartment, but a neighbor, apparently wanting the place himself and learning who they really were, threatened to report them to the secret police.

The family fled to the Arbat District downtown near the Kremlin and to the squalor of a cramped basement apartment. Because they were neither peasants nor workers, the state gave them the status of lishentzy, people regarded as socially alien, having no right to vote and therefore unable to secure good jobs. Yet they survived. Natalia had grown up to be dazzling in appearance and dashing in manner. Tall and svelte, with finely chiseled (and also very Romanov) features, she had radiant blue eyes, long blond hair and a captivating smile. Her mother, despite changing her name, never tried to conceal the past from Natalia. All the family photographs sat on a shelf in the shabby Androsov apartment: Grand Duke Nicholas Constantinovich, his brother K.R. and Natalia's father, Prince Alexander Iskander.

Natalia would proudly tell close friends of her real origins. Everyone was astonished; one of the friends said disgustedly, "Put those pictures away; it is indecent to keep them!" But the Androsovs were bold. Friends returning from Siberian exile, political pariahs, always knew that they could spend a few nights with the Androsovs. Natalia perhaps inherited some of her grandfather's propensity for adventure. She did not conceal that she was a Romanov.

Motorcyclist
She chose a wild career, that of a professional motorcyclist. She joined the famous sports club Dynamo and became a prominent motorcycle racer. Then the troubles came. It was 1939; Russia was experiencing Joseph Stalin's Great Terror, when millions were taken away to die, often inexplicably. Natalia was twenty-two. A young mechanic from Dynamo came courting her. When she boasted of her imperial lineage, he tried to blackmail her into sleeping with him. When she refused, he threatened to report her to the Lubyanka. Married and the mother of one, Natalia slapped him hard across the face. He was very tall and muscular, but "I was a very strong woman," she said proudly. Still, she panicked and burned all of her family papers. She changed her sports club and went to another famous one, Spartak. But in several weeks the Lubyanka summoned her. The secret police people were explicit. She had only two options, they said. Either she became a secret agent or she would be shot.

Agent
Under the codename Lola, Natalia began to work for Stalin's secret police. Her Lubyanka supervisor came regularly to the Arbat where they met, not in her apartment but in the shadows of an archway outside. Years later Natalia learned that her file at the Lubyanka described her in the most flattering terms. She was young, intelligent and attractive. She had, in short, all the qualities of an excellent agent except one: She did not want the job. Her friends knew nothing of her Lubyanka affiliation. But she knew which of them would be arrested and when.

Many people found Natalia's manner pleasingly raffish; she dressed in men's jackets and leggings. She smoked. She was proud of her ancestry, especially her grand ducal grandfather. She liked to whisper to guests that she was a Romanov, a descendant of tsars. Soon she became known as the Queen of the Arbat, a district that was taking on some of the character of New York's Greenwich Village. Visitors found hers a warm hearth in a cold and gray metropolis. She embarked on an extraordinary career as a vertical motorcyclist at Gorky Park. She drove the machine up a wall. The secret to success, she said, was to feel the vehicle and to look only forward, never at the wheels. Then the war broke out.

World War II
In 1941 Nazi Germany invaded Russia. In the fall of that year, when the enemy came very close to capturing Moscow and the Soviet Government fled, Natalia stayed in the city. She was in charge of her neighborhood fire brigade, on the alert for incendiary bombs dropped by German aircraft.  When these bombs hit the ground, they exploded and shot out a sea of flames. One had to catch the moment of impact and throw sand over the bomb to smother it before the explosion. Impatient Natalia would often seize the hissing bomb itself and throw it into the sand. Sometimes the white-hot bodies of bombs buried themselves deeply into the asphalt, setting even that aflame, and at night explosions and fires burst out everywhere, with people shouting and horses neighing in terror.

Natalia also joined a paramilitary militia as a motorcyclist courier. When she came to her Arbat neighborhood dressed exotically in a brown velvet jacket, army boots and breeches, some passerby, unused to such extravagant dress, detained her as "German saboteur." Natalia took another job, driving a truck, delivering bread to the troops at the front and clearing snow from downtown streets afterward. She discovered that she had talent for mechanical matters and she could keep her truck in good repair. As early as the summer 1942, Stalin, feeling more secure about the course of the war, decided that it was time to cheer up his people. He ordered more performances in Moscow; theater, concerts, opera and the circus.

After the war
Natalia returned to her earlier career as a vertical motorcyclist. In the summer of 1953, just after Stalin's death, they gave her a new assignment, promising it would be her last. Her career as a motorcyclist soared. She was at the top of her profession and toured of the USSR. She used the world's best motorcycles such as Harley Davidsons and Indian Scouts. But her performance, called "Fearless Flight" by people around her, was always dangerous. Sometimes she would spend a month in the hospital nursing broken bones.

Natalia became friendly with the leading Moscow bohemians of the day, and they dedicated their poems and stories to her. In July 1964, eligible for a pension, she retired. But when she stopped performing, the world began to forget her and her life took on a smaller dimension. In the late 1998, in her tiny studio apartment, the last Romanov in Russia and the only Russian among Romanovs, lived with her puppy dog which she found dying in the street. The dog was suffering from pneumonia and had been severely beaten. She picked him up, remembering the mournful howls of her grandfather's dogs when the grand duke was gone. She named the dog "Malysh" (Baby) and Malysh has grown up a healthy ginger-colored mongrel, friendly to visitors, passionately attached to Natalia. On her crutches she took the dog for walks herself, even in wintertime when the sidewalks were frozen. Throughout this term, her daughter and stepsons took care of her. She owned little of the great Romanov treasure, only her grandfather's crested silver spoons, a silver cup made for the coronation of Empress Elizabeth in 1742, a small decorative box, a cross and a tiny hinged icon. Whatever else of value she inherited, she had to sell in hard times. But material objects seemed not of great importance to her. In 1999 she died of old age at the age of 82.

Ancestry

References
Notes

Sources
 
 
 
 C. Arnold McNaughton, The Book of Kings: A Royal Genealogy, in 3 volumes (London, U.K.: Garnstone Press, 1973) , 

1917 births
1999 deaths
Russian princesses
Morganatic issue of Romanovs
Burials at Novodevichy Cemetery
People from Tashkent
Soviet people